Forest Capital State Museum is a  Florida State Park located  south of Perry on US 19/US 98. The museum contains displays that recount the history of the forest industry as well as the wildlife of the forest. Adjacent to the museum is the Cracker Homestead built in 1864 that depicts life on a Florida homestead with a house, barn, well, arbor, and garden.

Recreational activities
Activities include picnicing and viewing the exhibits. The park has three covered picnic pavilions.

Hours
The park is open every Thursday through Monday from 9 a.m. to 12 p.m. and from 1 p.m. to 5 p.m., except Thanksgiving, Christmas and New Year's Day.

Gallery

External links

Forest Capital Museum State Park at Florida State Parks
Forest Capital State Museum at Absolutely Florida
Forest Capital State Museum at Wildernet

State parks of Florida
Parks in Taylor County, Florida
History of Florida
Museums in Taylor County, Florida
Historic house museums in Florida
Forestry museums in the United States
Industry museums in Florida
Houses completed in 1864
Open-air museums in Florida